The National People's Front (NAPF) is a South African political party formed in 2018 by Bheki Gumbi, former national deputy chairperson of the National Freedom Party.

The party is campaigning on a platform of fast-forwarding land expropriation, strong borders, priority for South Africans over foreign nationals, and on abolishing "Roman laws".

The party contested the 2019 general election, failing to win any seats.

Election results

National elections

|-
! Election
! Total votes
! Share of vote
! Seats 
! +/–
! Government
|-
! 2019
| 4,019
| 0.02%
| 
| –
| 
|}

Provincial elections

! rowspan=2 | Election
! colspan=2 | Eastern Cape
! colspan=2 | Free State
! colspan=2 | Gauteng
! colspan=2 | Kwazulu-Natal
! colspan=2 | Limpopo
! colspan=2 | Mpumalanga
! colspan=2 | North-West
! colspan=2 | Northern Cape
! colspan=2 | Western Cape
|-
! % !! Seats
! % !! Seats
! % !! Seats
! % !! Seats
! % !! Seats
! % !! Seats
! % !! Seats
! % !! Seats
! % !! Seats
|-
! 2019
| - || -
| - || -
| 0.03% || 0/73
| 0.07% || 0/80
| - || -
| - || -
| - || -
| - || -
| - || -
|}

References 

2018 establishments in South Africa
Political parties in South Africa
Political parties established in 2018